This is a list of lighthouses in Argentina.

Lighthouses

Beacons

See also 
 Lists of lighthouses and lightvessels

References

External links 

 
 Lista de Faros Argentinos Servicio de Hidrografía Naval

Lighthouses

Lighthouses
Argentina